NGC 6541 (also known as Caldwell 78) is a globular cluster in the southern constellation of Corona Australis. It is estimated to be around 14 billion years old.

The globular cluster was discovered by Niccolò Cacciatore at the Palermo Astronomical Observatory, Sicily, on March 19, 1826. It was independently found by James Dunlop on July 3, 1826.

The cluster is relatively small, having just 94 blue straggler stars.

References

External links
 
 NGC 6541 at SEDS NGC objects pages
 NGC 6541 at DOCdb (Deep Sky Observer's Companion)
 

Corona Australis
Globular clusters
6541
078b
Astronomical objects discovered in 1826